Kyle Brandon Lowder (born August 27, 1980) is an American actor. He began his career in 2000, when he was cast in the role of Brady Black on the NBC soap opera Days of Our Lives; he remained in the role until his exit in 2005. Lowder went on to portray the role of Rick Forrester on The Bold and the Beautiful from January 2007 to January 2011. In 2018, he returned to Days of Our Lives as Rex Brady.

Early life
He graduated from Pleasantville High School in Pleasantville, New York in 1998.

Career
In August 2000, Lowder was cast in the aged role of Brady Black on the NBC soap opera, Days of Our Lives. In 2003, Lowder guest-starred as himself during the ninth season of Friends. That same year, he received a Daytime Emmy Award nomination for his work as Brady. In September 2005, it was announced that he would exit Days of Our Lives, following the soap's decision to not renew the actor's deal; he made his final appearance on September 15 of the same year.

In December 2006, it was announced that Lowder had joined the cast of The Bold and the Beautiful as Rick Forrester, succeeding actor Justin Torkildsen; he made his first appearance on January 25, 2007. In January 2011, he announced his exit from the soap, citing it a "mutual decision" between him and executive producer Brad Bell. That same year, Lowder joined the cast of the web soap DeVanity in its second season. In 2012, he appeared as Stacee Jax in Rock of Ages at The Venetian Las Vegas.

In May 2018, it was announced that Lowder would return to Days of Our Lives. He made his first appearance in the role of Rex Brady on October 19, 2018. He exited the role in August 2019. Lowder returned to the role in 2020.

Personal life
On August 3, 2002, he married his Days of Our Lives co-star Arianne Zucker. In December 2009, they welcomed their first child, a daughter. In March 2014, it was announced that Lowder and Zucker had divorced.

Filmography
 2000–2005: Days of Our Lives as Brady Black (Role from: August 2000 - September 2005)
 2003: Friends as himself in The One with the Soap Opera Party
 2006: Cuts as Eric (1 episode)
 2007–2011: The Bold and the Beautiful as Rick Forrester (Role: January 2007 — January 2011)
 2012: "DeVanity" as Andrew Regis  (3 episodes)
 2018–2023: Days of Our Lives as Rex Brady
 2020: The Amityville Harvest as Vincent Miller

References

External links

Lowder, Kyle Brandon
20th-century American male actors
American male soap opera actors
Living people
People from Pleasantville, New York